Leslie Maynard Ward (2 May 1908 – 13 January 1981) was an English cricketer who made one appearance in first-class cricket in 1930. He was a right-handed batsman, who bowled both right-arm medium and right-arm off break.

Ward made his only appearance in first-class cricket when he was selected to play for Warwickshire against Leicestershire at Hinckley. In a drawn match, Ward batted once, scoring 5 runs in Warwickshire's only innings, but was dismissed bowled by Norman Armstrong. He wasn't required to bowl in Leicestershire's first-innings, during which Joseph Mayer and Derek Foster shared nine of the ten wickets to fall as Leicestershire were bowled out for 53 in 23.2 overs. Made to follow-on in their second-innings, Leicestershire reached 294/8 at the close of the match, with Ward taking his only first-class wicket when he dismissed Ewart Astill, finishing with figures of 1/29 from 8 overs.

He died at Bideford, Devon on 13 January 1981.

References

External links
Leslie Ward at ESPNcricinfo
Leslie Ward at CricketArchive

`

1908 births
1981 deaths
Cricketers from Coventry
English cricketers
Warwickshire cricketers